Stephen Paternite (born 1952) is an American multimedia artist known for his roadkill artwork & infrared photographs. He received his initial art training in the early 1970s at the Cooper School of Art, Cleveland, Ohio.

Career 
Paternite began his professional art career in 1973. Since that time, he has exhibited artwork in over 185 group exhibitions and 21 solo exhibitions throughout the world. Notable exhibits include the 2010 infrared photography centennial hosted by the Royal Photographic Society of Great Britain.

In 1973, Paternite published two limited edition portfolios of serigraphic prints, entitled  "Six Clouds"  volume 1 and volume 2. 
In 1974, he was the recipient of an "Artists Fellowship Award" (sculpture) from the National Endowment for the Arts (NEA), Washington, D.C.
In 1980, Paternite published "The Infrared Portfolio" a limited-edition portfolio of 10 original black-and-white infrared photographs, with an introduction by Robert M. Doty.
In 1981, Paternite published "Below The Visible Spectrum" a limited-edition portfolio of 10 original black-and-white infrared photographs, with introductions by Nicholas C. Hlobeczy and Joe LaRose.
In 1982, he co-edited and published the "American Infrared Survey" this book, (the first of its kind) explored artistic trends in black-and-white & color infrared photography. Over 300 photographers from across the United States participated in this project, which not only resulted in the publication of the book, but also a travelling exhibition of original infrared photographs.  The "American Infrared Survey" traveling exhibition toured the following venues:
The Florida Institute of Technology, Jensen Beach, Florida, in 1983
The County College of Morris, Morris, New Jersey, in 1984
The Vivian Esders Gallery, Paris, France, in 1984
Images Gallery, Cincinnati, Ohio, in 1986
In 1988, Paternite was awarded an "Individual Artists Fellowship" (sculpture) from the Ohio Arts Council (OAC), Columbus, Ohio

Media 
In 1994, he co-produced a VHS video entitled "Creature-Nites of Ohio" ~  This bizarrely highlighted the life and times of 10 species of hybrid animals created by Paternite in 1989. (approximate running time: 11 minutes). Stephen Paternite has been creating art with dead creatures for over sixteen years, probably longer. As well, he has created a video called "Creature Nites” which is a docu-drama of non-existent creatures.
In 2003, Paternite (self) produced a DVD, entitled "Too Gross For Discovery" ~ This DVD is the original (rough-cut) episode of "Dirty Jobs" with host Mike Rowe. The episode from 2003, which featured the roadkill artwork of Stephen Paternite, was ultimately rejected by the network for being "too gross" for broadcast. (approximate running time: 17 minutes) ......  In 2004, Paternite published a limited-edition lithographic art print illustrating 7 mixed-media animal sculptures he created between 2002 & 2004.

Since he began his art career in 1970, Stephen Paternite has exhibited his artwork in over 130 group exhibitions, and has mounted 16 one-person shows throughout the United States and South America.

Controversy
In 1989, Paternite became embroiled in a controversy regarding some of his (government-funded) mixed media taxidermy sculptures. During an exhibition of his (Ohio Arts Council) grant sculptures at the Canton Art Institute, in Ohio, an uproar of sorts ensued over Paternite's use or mixture of real freeze-dried cats and baby-doll parts, and that he had received a government grant to make such a piece. The local controversy, which lasted for months, escalated to national attention when CNN (Cable News Network) began airing the story on its "Prime News" segment.

See also 
 Contemporary art
 Mixed media art
 Taxidermy art/Rogue taxidermy

External links
Creature Nites of Ohio docucomedy film by Stephen paternite
"Creature Nites of Ohio Controversy" - Letters to the editor regarding Animal Sculpture Show
Stephen Paternite website
Stephen Paternite archive of early works

References

1952 births
Living people
American multimedia artists
20th-century American photographers
21st-century American photographers
20th-century American sculptors
20th-century American male artists
21st-century American sculptors
21st-century American male artists
Contemporary sculptors
Artists from Akron, Ohio
Sculptors from Ohio